The , in English usually rendered as Logothete of the Course/Drome/ or Postal Logothete, was the head of the department of the Public Post (or simply), and one of the most senior fiscal ministers (logothetes) of the Byzantine Empire.

History and functions
Until the late 4th century, the administration of the Roman Empire's Public Post was a responsibility of the praetorian prefectures.

It rose quickly in importance, however, and came to combine, according to the French scholar Rodolphe Guilland, the functions of a modern interior, security and foreign minister, although his role in foreign affairs remained by far the most important.

Consequently, the incumbent of the office often served as the Empire's chief minister, although this ultimately depended on the reigning emperor. The Byzantines never formalized such a position, nor was it attached to a particular office, rather it was granted ad hoc on the basis of each emperor's favour towards a particular courtier, irrespective of rank or office. Notable  who served as chief ministers include Staurakios under Empress Irene of Athens, Theoktistos during the regency of Empress Theodora (842–856), Stylianos Zaoutzes in the early reign of Leo VI the Wise, Leo Phokas the Younger during the rule of his brother Nikephoros II Phokas, John under Constantine IX Monomachos, and Nikephoritzes under Michael VII Doukas. 

The 10th-century De Ceremoniis of Constantine VII Porphyrogenitus depicts the administrative and ceremonial roles of the : he was received in audience every morning by the Emperor in the Chrysotriklinos, he presented the senior officials at award-giving ceremonies, and had a prominent part in the reception of foreign embassies, as well as the exhibition of captives. After the reforms of Emperor Alexios I Komnenos, in  the  ceased to exist as a department, but the  remained, now responsible for official communications and for supervising foreigners resident in Constantinople.

Subordinate officials

The , his senior deputy.
Translators, also attested (as ) in the Notitia Dignitatum.

References

Sources

Further reading

 
 
 

Byzantine administrative offices
Foreign relations of the Byzantine Empire
Heads of government